German Edgardo Leitzelar Vidaurreta (born 4 July 1945) is a Honduran lawyer and politician, he was a member of the National Congress of Honduras representing the Innovation and Unity Party for Francisco Morazán.

References

1945 births
Living people
20th-century Honduran lawyers
Deputies of the National Congress of Honduras
Innovation and Unity Party politicians
People from Francisco Morazán Department
21st-century Honduran lawyers